Asher Barash was a writer, editor, teacher, and translator. He wrote stories, non-fiction, and poetry about the “early struggles of Palestinian Jewry.”

He was born in Galicia. He won the Bialik Prize in 1940 for his Hebrew language novel ‘’Alien Love’’.

He died in June 1952, aged 63, of a heart attack.

See also
S. Y. Agnon

References

Israeli writers
Year of birth missing (living people)
Living people